Rustam Skhatbievich Assakalov (born 13 July 1984) is a Russian-born Uzbekistani Greco-Roman wrestler of Adyg heritage. He won gold medals at the 2014 Asian Games and 2013 and 2015 Asian Championships, and silver medals at the 2018 Asian Games, 2015 World Championships and 2014 and 2018 Asian championships.

Assakalov took up wrestling in 1994 in Novorossiysk, Russia, following his father, a former wrestler. He placed third at the 2009 Russian Championships. His younger brother Bislan Assakalov is a World Cadet Champion. 

In 2022, he won the gold medal in his event at the Vehbi Emre & Hamit Kaplan Tournament held in Istanbul, Turkey. He competed in the 97kg event at the 2022 World Wrestling Championships held in Belgrade, Serbia.

References

External links 

 
 
 

1984 births
Living people
People from Novorossiysk
Circassian people of Russia
Uzbekistani male sport wrestlers
Wrestlers at the 2014 Asian Games
Medalists at the 2014 Asian Games
Wrestlers at the 2018 Asian Games
Medalists at the 2018 Asian Games
Asian Games medalists in wrestling
World Wrestling Championships medalists
Asian Games gold medalists for Uzbekistan
Asian Games silver medalists for Uzbekistan
Wrestlers at the 2016 Summer Olympics
Olympic wrestlers of Uzbekistan
Russian emigrants to Uzbekistan
Asian Wrestling Championships medalists
Wrestlers at the 2020 Summer Olympics
21st-century Uzbekistani people